Marina Mstislavovna Neyolova (born 8 January 1947) is a Soviet and Russian stage and film actress. She has appeared in 37 films since 1969. People's Artist of the RSFSR (1987).

Filmography
 An Old, Old Tale (1968) as princess / daughter of innkeeper
 Tomorrow, on April 3rd... (Завтра, третьего апреля…, 1969) as Ariadna Nikolayevna (voice, role played by Eneken Aksel)
 Shadow (Тень, 1971) as Annuanciata
 Monologue (Монолог, 1972) as Nina
 The Prince and the Pauper (Принц и нищий, 1972) as Elizabeth I
 With You and Without You (С тобой и без тебя, 1973) as Stesha
 Speech for the Defence (Слово для защиты, 1976) as Valentina Kostina
 Errors of Youth (Ошибки юности, 1978) as Polina
 Autumn Marathon (Осенний марафон, 1979) as Alla Mikhailovna Yermakova
 Ladies Invite Gentlemen (Дамы приглашают кавалеров, 1980) as Anya Pozdnyakova
 Alice in Wonderland (Алиса в Стране чудес, 1981) as Alice (voice)
 The Story of Voyages (Сказка странствий, 1983) as Martha (voice, role played by Tatyana Aksyuta)
 Another Man's Wife and a Husband Under the Bed (Чужая жена и муж под кроватью, 1984) as Lisa
 The Black Monk (Чёрный монах, 1988) as Tatyana Pesotskaya (voice, role played by Tatyana Drubich)
 Dear Yelena Sergeyevna (Дорогая Елена Сергеевна, 1988) as Yelena Sergeyevna
 You Are My Only Love (Ты у меня одна, 1993) as Natalya Anatolyevna Semyonova-Timoshina
 Prison Romance (Тюремный романс, 1993) as Yelena Andreyevna Shemelova
 Inspector (Ревизор, 1996) as Anna Andreyevna
 The Barber of Siberia (Сибирский цирюльник, 1998) as Andrei Tolstoi's mother
 Azazel (Азазель, 2002) as Lady Ester
 Alice in Wonderland (2010) as Mallymkun, the Dormouse (Russian dub)
 Alice Through the Looking Glass (2016) as Mallymkun, the Dormouse (Russian dub)
 Thawed Carp (Карп отмороженный, 2017) as Yelena Mikhailovna Nikiforova

References

External links

1947 births
20th-century Russian actresses
21st-century Russian actresses
Living people
Actresses from Saint Petersburg
Academicians of the Russian Academy of Cinema Arts and Sciences "Nika"
Russian State Institute of Performing Arts alumni
Honored Artists of the RSFSR
People's Artists of the RSFSR
Recipients of the Lenin Komsomol Prize
Recipients of the Nika Award
Recipients of the Order "For Merit to the Fatherland", 3rd class
Recipients of the Order "For Merit to the Fatherland", 4th class
Recipients of the Order of Honour (Russia)
Recipients of the Vasilyev Brothers State Prize of the RSFSR
State Prize of the Russian Federation laureates
Russian film actresses
Russian stage actresses
Russian television actresses
Russian voice actresses
Soviet film actresses
Soviet stage actresses
Soviet television actresses
Soviet voice actresses